Dr. Janis Alene Mayes is an American author, literary critic and translator and a professor in Africana literature.

Early life
Mayes gained her undergraduate degree in French literature at Fisk University. She was a Fulbright Scholar. She had additional study as a scholar at the University of Paris-Sorbonne. In the 1980s she moved to Syracuse, New York, where she began teaching at Syracuse University in the Department of African American Studies; she is currently a professor there. She teaches in the Department of African American Studies at Syracuse University.

Career
She has made contributions in French- and English-language literature in the African Diaspora. Her specialties are in French translation literary practices. She has translated anthologies and books in francophone literatures. Her translation of A Rain of Words is an anthology of francophone poetry. She is the director of a US study abroad program that examines the historical connections between African Americans and "Black Paris", entitled Paris Noir. The Syracuse University program claims to have shaped Africana-focused cultural programs at leading museums in Paris such as the Louvre. Nina Simone, Archie Shepp, Barbara Chase-Riboud, Sonia Sanchez and Toni Morrison are said to have been involved. She was a board member of the Toni Morrison Society. In 2004, she participated in conversations with Toni Morrison at the Theatre de la Madeleine after the unveiling of a bench commemorating the end of slavery in France. She has also organized cultural literary conferences, including an event with Discover Paris! that celebrated the literary contribution of Toni Morrison to the African diaspora.

Published work 
 Taking the Blues Back Home/Ramener le blues chez soi, Présence Africaine  (translation)- 2010
 A Rain of Words: A Bilingual Anthology of Women's Poetry in Francophone Africa, Irène Assiba d'Almeida (translation) – 2009
 The Blind Kingdom, Véronique Tadjo (translation) – 2008
 Mapping Intersections: African Literature and Africa's Development (with Anne Adams) – 1998
 "Of Dreams Deferred, Dead or Alive: African Perspectives on African-American Writers",
 The City Where No One Dies, Dadié, Bernard (translation; Washington, DC: Three Continents) – 1986
 African Literature and Africa's Development (AWP) (with Anne Adams)

Achievements, honors, awards
President, African Literature Association – 2003
Fulbright Scholar

References

Living people
Brown University alumni
Fisk University alumni
Literary critics of French
French literary critics
Women literary critics
Syracuse University faculty
African-American writers
American writers
Year of birth missing (living people)
21st-century African-American people